Zoe Hives (born 24 October 1996) is a professional Australian tennis player.

She has career-high WTA rankings of World No. 142 in singles and World No. 144 in doubles, both achieved in 2019. Hives so far has won four singles and two doubles titles on the ITF Women's Circuit.

In November 2017, Hives won the most important doubles career title to date at the 2017 Bendigo Women's International, partnering Alison Bai. This resulted in them being awarded a wildcard into the Australian Open.

Career

2019: Grand Slam debut and first win
In January, Hives was awarded a wildcard into the Australian Open and defeated Bethanie Mattek-Sands in round one – her first ever Grand Slam main-draw win. She lost to Caroline Garcia in the second round.

2022: Wimbledon debut
In January 2022, Hives played her first professional match since September 2019 and made the second round of the 2022 Australian Open – Women's singles qualifying.

She entered into the main draw, using protected ranking in the qualifying competition, making her Grand Slam debut at the 2022 Wimbledon Championships.

2023: United Cup debut

Coaching
Hives is coached by Michael Logarzo and based in Melbourne.

Grand Slam performance timelines

Singles

Doubles

WTA finals

Doubles: 1 (1 title)

ITF Circuit finals

Singles: 5 (4 titles, 1 runner–up)

Doubles: 2 (2 titles)

Notes

References

External links
 
 
 
 Zoe Hives website

1996 births
Living people
Australian female tennis players
Sportspeople from Ballarat
Tennis people from Victoria (Australia)
21st-century Australian women